Eyach virus (EYAV) is a viral infection (genus Coltivirus) in the Reoviridae family transmitted by a tick vector. It has been isolated from Ixodes ricinus and I. ventalloi ticks in Europe.


Transmission and clinical syndromes 
Eyach virus is acquired by tick bite. The tick gets infected after a blood meal from a vertebrate host, which is suspected to be the European rabbit O. cunniculus. Eyach virus has been linked to tick-borne encephalitis, as well as polyradiculoneuritis and meningopolyneuritis, based on serological samples of patients with these neurological disorders.

References 

Coltiviruses
Reoviruses
Zoonoses
Arthropod-borne viral fevers and viral haemorrhagic fevers
Tick-borne diseases

de:Eyach-Virus